Dunham Hill railway station was a railway station in Dunham-on-the-Hill, Cheshire. It was opened in 1850 and closed in 1952. Near to the station was a branch line leading to the former ROF Dunham on the Hill explosives storage depot.  The station buildings were demolished after closure but the platforms remained until the 1970s.

References

Further reading

Disused railway stations in Cheshire
Former Birkenhead Railway stations
Railway stations in Great Britain opened in 1850
Railway stations in Great Britain closed in 1952